Sortir du nucléaire (French for "nuclear phase-out") is the name of several organisations: 
 Sortir du nucléaire (Canada)
 Sortir du nucléaire (France)